Klubi i Futbollit Burreli is an Albanian football club based in Burrel, Mat District. Their home ground is the Liri Ballabani Stadium and they compete in the Kategoria e Parë.

History
The club was founded in 1928, but was not an organised club until 1935 under the name Deja Burrel. The name was changed in 1945 to 31 Korriku Burreli, which was again changed in 1951 to Puna Burrel. Between 1958 and 1991 the club was renamed 31 Korriku Burrel before changing to its current name Burreli.

The club competed in the lower leagues of Albania until 1981 when they participated in the Albanian National Championship for the first time. But they were relegated in their first top flight season after finishing bottom of the table during the 1981–82 season. They were back in the top division after just one season in the Kategoria e Parë and were part of the 1983–84 Albanian National Championship. They were relegated again for the second time in the space of just two-years after finishing rock bottom of the table, again being relegated with just 20 points through the entire season.

Honours
 Kategoria e Parë:
 Winners (4): 1980–81, 1982–83, 1997–98
 Runners-up (1): 1986–87
 Kategoria e Dytë:
 Winners (1): 1959
Minor trophies
 Sporti Popullor Cup:
 Winners (1): 1978
 Puna Cup:
 Winners (1): 1980
 Zëri i Rinisë Cup:
 Winners (1): 1983

Current squad

Current staff

Historical list of coaches

 Robert Jashari (1980-1984)
 Baftjar Punavia (1997-1999)
 Baftjar Punavia (2006)
 Elvis Plori (Jan 2012 - Jun 2012)
 Elvis Plori (Oct 2012 - May 2013)
 Elvis Plori (Sep 2013 - Dec 2013)
 Vladimir Gjoni (Dec 2013 - Mar 2015)
 Vladimir Gjoni (Aug 2015 - Dec 2015)
 Ritvan Kulli (Feb 2016 - May 2017)
 Julian Ahmataj (Jan 2018 - Apr 2018)
 Ritvan Kulli (Apr 2018 - Jun 2018)
 Stavri Nica (Aug 2018 - Oct 2018)
 Elvis Plori (Oct 2018 - Jun 2019 )
 Gentian Stojku (Aug 2019 - Oct 2019)
 Alert Alcani (Oct 2019 -Jan 2021)
 Samuel Nikaj (Feb 2021 -Apr 2021)
 Renato Hoti (Apr 2021 -June 2021)
 Saimir Patushi (June 2021 - Dec 2021)
 Alert Alcani (Dec 2021 )
 Samuel Nikaj (Feb 2021 -June 2021)
 Renato Hoti (Jul 2022 -Jan 2023)
 Dorian Bubeqi (Jan 2023 –)

Recent seasons

References

External links
First Division Standings and Stats
Albania Sport

Burreli
Association football clubs established in 1952
1952 establishments in Albania
Mat (municipality)
Kategoria e Dytë clubs